"I Didn't Know I Loved You (Till I Saw You Rock and Roll)" is a song by English glam rock singer Gary Glitter, written by Glitter with Mike Leander and produced by Mike Leander. It was released as the second single from his debut studio album, Glitter (1972) and peaked at No. 4 on the UK Singles Chart.  It was also Glitter's second and last charted record in the US, peaking at #35.  Rock Goddess and Planet Patrol both recorded cover versions in 1983.

Track listing
"I Didn't Know I Loved You (Till I Saw You Rock and Roll)" – 3:19
"Hard on Me" – 2:24

Chart performance

References

External links
 

1972 songs
1972 singles
Gary Glitter songs
Songs written by Mike Leander
Songs written by Gary Glitter
Song recordings produced by Mike Leander